722 Naval Air Squadron (722 NAS) was a Naval Air Squadron of the Royal Navy's Fleet Air Arm created on 7th September 1944, where it was responsible for assisting in ship and aircraft gunnery practice. On 24 October 1945 following the end of the Second World War.

History

Southern India 

The squadron began its operational life in Southern India, with Lt. Cdr (A) A.F.E. Payen RNVR in command at the squadron's HQ at RNAS Tambaram. On 23 October 1944 Lt. Cdr (A) K.C. Johnson SANF (V) took command of the squadron.

On 7 September 1944 'X' flight was established at RAF Juhu, and was responsible for East coast duties, with a focus on the area around Bombay. Initially the squadron operated 12 Miles Martinets, one Stinson Reliant, and one Supermarine Walrus, but in March 1945 it received four Fairey Swordfish. On 18 September 1945, the flight was moved to RNAS Cochin.

Three months later, on 28 December 1944, 'Y' flight was established at RAF Vizagapatam, and was responsible for West coast duties. It operated with a number of Grumman F4F Wildcats, until it was disbanded on 14 October 1945.

Towards the end of the squadron's operational life, it received its third and final commanding officer, when Lt. Cdr (A) L.G. Morris RN assumed command on 8 March 1945.

On 24 October 1945 following the end of the Second World War, it was determined the squadron was no longer required and it was disbanded.

Aircraft Operated 
The squadron operated a variety of different aircraft and versions:

 Miles Martinet
 Stinson Reliant
 Supermarine Walrus
 Fairey Swordfish
 Grumman F4F Wildcat

References

Citations

Bibliography

700 series Fleet Air Arm squadrons
Military units and formations established in 1944
Air squadrons of the Royal Navy in World War II